Orphanoclera is a genus of moth in the family Gelechiidae. It contains the species Orphanoclera tyriocoma, which is found in Indonesia (Java).

References

Gelechiinae